George Kinzie Fitzsimons (September 4, 1928 – July 28, 2013) was an American prelate of the Roman Catholic Church. He served as Bishop of Salina from 1984 to 2004.

Biography
George Fitzsimons was born in Kansas City, Missouri, to George K. and Margaret Mary (née Donavan) Fitzsimons, both native Kansans. He belonged to St. Francis Xavier Church as a child, and attended Rockhurst High School and Rockhurst University in Kansas City.  Various lay ministries that were expanded and developed included Liturgists, Religious Education Coordinators, Youth ministers, Ministers to the elderly and Pastoral Assistants. In 1952–53, before joining the priesthood, Lt Fitzsimons served as a  naval aviator with U.S. Navy Patrol Squadron VP-49. After serving in the U.S. Air Force (1950–1954) and briefly in business, he began his studies for the priesthood at Conception Seminary in Missouri.

Fitzsimons was ordained a priest by Bishop John Cody on March 18, 1961. He then served as an associate pastor, high school teacher, college chaplain, chancellor/Vicar General of the Diocese of Kansas City-St. Joseph.

On May 20, 1975, Fitzsimons was appointed Auxiliary Bishop of Kansas City-St. Joseph and Titular Bishop of Pertusa by Pope Paul VI. He received his episcopal consecration on the following July 3 from Bishop Charles Herman Helmsing, with Archbishop William Wakefield Baum and Bishop Joseph Vincent Sullivan serving as co-consecrators, at the Cathedral of the Immaculate Conception in Kansas City.

Fitzsimons was named the eighth Bishop of Salina, Kansas, on March 28, 1984. He was serving as pastor of Christ the King Church in Kansas City at the time of his appointment. He was installed by Archbishop Strecker at Sacred Heart Cathedral, Salina on the following May 29.

During his tenure, he established an Office of Lay Ministry, with a director and an advisory Board, funded and initiated by the Catholic Church Extension Society in Chicago, as well as a Rural Life Commission. He initiated the RENEW parish spiritual growth program. Marymount College closed in 1989 because of financial difficulties. Due to a declining population and priest shortage, he was also forced to merge several parishes but did erect St. Nicholas of Myra Church in Hays and St. Thomas More Church in Manhattan.

After reaching the mandatory retirement age of 75, Bishop Fitzsimons resigned as Bishop on October 21, 2004. Bishop Emeritus Fitzsimons then resided at St. Patrick Parish in Ogden. In 2008, his lower left leg was amputated due to a severe infection; he then used a prosthesis.

He died at age 84 in Ogden on July 28, 2013.

See also

References

1928 births
2013 deaths
United States Navy officers
United States Air Force officers
People from Kansas City, Missouri
Roman Catholic Diocese of Kansas City–Saint Joseph
Roman Catholic bishops of Salina
Rockhurst University alumni
American amputees
20th-century Roman Catholic bishops in the United States
21st-century Roman Catholic bishops in the United States
Religious leaders from Missouri
Catholics from Missouri